The Holy War is the name given to the American college football rivalry game played annually by the Brigham Young University (BYU) Cougars and the University of Utah (U of U) Utes. It is part of the larger BYU–Utah sports rivalry. In this context, the term "Holy War" refers to the fact that BYU is owned and administered by the Church of Jesus Christ of Latter-day Saints (LDS Church) and the University of Utah is a public university with a large LDS student population. The proximity of the two schools, the athletic successes of the two teams, and the longevity of the series all continue to foster the rivalry.

Both teams played in the same conference from 1922 to 2010, most recently in the Western Athletic Conference and Mountain West Conference. During the Mountain West years, the Holy War was often the deciding game of the conference title. Despite Utah moving to the Pac-12 Conference in 2011 and BYU becoming an independent the same year, the two universities agreed to continue playing. The series was briefly interrupted in 2014 and 2015 for Utah to play a home-and-home series with Michigan — the first since 1943 to 1945, when BYU did not field a team due to World War II. Games have since been scheduled until 2028—with another interruption in 2022 and 2023 for Utah to play a home series with Florida.

The two-year hiatus was unexpectedly cut short when the 2015 Las Vegas Bowl pitted BYU against Utah, creating the "Holy War in Sin City" in the postseason.

Origin

Origin of the term 'Holy War'
While the Holy War is often used to describe the BYU-Utah rivalry, the phrase wasn't used in connection with the rivalry until the 1990s when local sports talk radio hosts began coining the term. Prior to this, the Holy War was used in local media to describe the occasional matchup between BYU and Notre Dame. The term became widely used locally and nationally from 2003-2008, when the winner of the game simultaneously became the Mountain West Conference champion, often with nationwide acclaim.

Rivalry components
Several components make the Holy War particularly fierce. The U of U and BYU are two of the biggest colleges in the state of Utah. As the name of the rivalry implies, religion is a large component of the rivalry. The U of U has a large LDS student population and BYU is owned by the LDS Church and has an almost entirely LDS student population. The long length of rivalry is also a major element.

Disputed origin
The two schools disagree on when the first game in the series was played. Utah claims the first game was played in 1896 against Brigham Young Academy (BYA). BYU's athletic website shows their schedule dating back to 1922, but no earlier. The six games played from 1896 to 1898 ended with a 3–3 split. Utah claims these six results in the all-time series records, while BYU does not.

Religion

The U of U is the flagship university of the state of Utah, a state known for its substantial LDS population, while BYU is the flagship university of the LDS Church. The matchup has been described as taking on religious, or "church vs. state" undertones.

Proximity

Consequently, the two teams compete for recruits and fan support. It is not uncommon for friends, neighbors, and even family members to have opposite allegiances.

Team successes
While the two teams have not necessarily been strong at the same time, they had the most conference championships in the Mountain West Conference before both left the MWC in 2011. Each team has had four conference championships since the creation of the MWC in 1999. Including championships of other conferences, Utah has 24 conference championships in its history, while BYU has 23. Both of these numbers are well ahead of the current MWC member with the most conference championships, Colorado State, who has 15. The 1984 BYU Cougars football team won a consensus national champion with an undefeated season and victory over Michigan in the 1984 Holiday Bowl.

BYU again received national recognition in 1996/1997 as one of the first non-major conference teams to break into what would become the New Year's Six of the 2010s   BYU finished ranked 5th in the final 1996 AP poll 1996 NCAA Division I-A football rankings.

During the era of the now-defunct Bowl Championship Series (BCS) (1998–2013), Utah played in two BCS bowls: the 2005 Fiesta Bowl (a 35–7 victory over Pitt) and the 2009 Sugar Bowl (a 31–17 victory over Alabama). For these BCS bowl victories, Utah finished ranked in the AP Poll #4 and #2, respectively. Many sports media members and observers, including ESPN's Rick Reilly, argued that Utah (as the nation's lone undefeated FBS team) should have been selected to play Florida in the BCS title game or awarded the AP national championship. Utah did receive national championship recognition from NCAA-designated major selector Anderson & Hester-which is now recognized by the NCAA in their official football guide.

Fanbase comparisons 
In 2011, the New York Times polled fans of all current FBS schools to rank them according to the size of their respective fan bases. BYU was ranked #43 nationally with 709,864 people self-identifying as BYU fans, while Utah was ranked #67 with 351,939 people self-identifying as fans.

In 2017, Utah saw an average of 45,913 fans attend home games and 52,489 fans on the road (including a bowl game).

BYU averaged 56,267 fans at home and 35,019 at away games. LaVell Edwards Stadium has a capacity of 63,470 meaning that the stadium was filled, on average, at 88% of capacity.

Series history

The University of Deseret
The University of Deseret was established February 28, 1850 by the General Assembly of the provisional State of Deseret. This date is enshrined on the seal of the U of U. The University of Deseret closed in 1853 and was reestablished in 1867. In 1892, the school's name was changed to the University of Utah, to coincide with Utah's first football team. The team had won 1 game and lost 2 in their first campaign, including a loss to future rival Utah State. The U of U was controlled by the LDS Church from its founding until well after Statehood in 1896.

Brigham Young Academy years
Before 1903, BYU was known as BYA.  During the 1890s, Utah and BYA played six times in football. The two schools split the series 3–3.

BYA stopped playing football in 1900, following a player death, and did not start again until 1922, after it had become BYU. BYU does not recognize these first six meetings and only recognizes games played from 1922 onward.

Utah's early dominance 
After a twenty-three year hiatus, BYU reinstated their football team for the 1922 season. Utah began its early dominance over BYU with a 49–0 victory on October 14, 1922. Utah maintained the winning steak until 1942, when the Cougars shocked the Utes 12–7 at Utah. The rivalry then took a hiatus from 1943 to 1945 because BYU did not field a team due to World War II. When the rivalry continued in 1946, the Utes continued their domination over the Cougars, winning or tying the next twelve contests. Except for a three-year BYU winning streak from 1965 to 1967, the rivalry continued this trend through the 1971 season, at which point Utah had amassed a 41–8–4 record against BYU.

LaVell Edwards era 
In 1972, the rivalry shifted in favor of BYU, when they hired LaVell Edwards to coach the team. In his first season, BYU beat Utah 16–7 for its first victory in four years. The win signaled the beginning of BYU's dominance against Utah. From 1972 to 1992, BYU went 19–2 against Utah.

During those years, Utah went through a series of coaches that all ended with losing records against Edwards and BYU.  Bill Meek's Utes went 0–2 against Edwards during Meek's last two years (1972–1973). Tom Lovat (1974–1976) was 0–3. Wayne Howard (1977–1981) was 1–4. Chuck Stobart (1982–1984) was 0–3. Jim Fassel (1985–1989) was 1–4. Finally, Utah found some success when it hired Ron McBride (1990–2002). McBride would finish with a 5–6 record against Edwards, but he started with three consecutive losses.

1977–1981: Edwards versus Howard

Wayne Howard's Crusade

During the 1977 meeting, BYU was on the way to winning in a 38–8 blowout. Nonetheless, Edwards put starting quarterback Marc Wilson back into the game so Wilson could set an NCAA record for passing yards. Wilson succeeded in setting the record (subsequently broken) and finished the game with 571 passing yards. The incident infuriated Utah head coach Howard. After the game, he said, "This today will be inspiring. The hatred between BYU and Utah is nothing compared to what it will be. It will be a crusade to beat BYU from now on. This is a prediction: in the next two years Utah will drill BYU someday, but we won’t run up the score even if we could set an NCAA record against them."  The next year, Howard made good on his promise. The Utes came from behind to upset the Cougars 23–22. The 1978 win was Utah's first against an Edwards coached BYU team.

Jim McMahon says, "Scoreboard."

During the 1980 Holy War, BYU quarterback Jim McMahon helped engineer a blowout. Most of the game he was heckled by a contingent of Utah fans at Rice Stadium. After throwing for another touchdown late in the 56–6 win, he pointed at the scoreboard to quiet the hecklers. The game was in the midst of a 12–1 BYU season. It was also their second consecutive win against Utah and their eighth win out of the last nine games.  The fifty point margin of victory is the largest for either team in the series.

1982–1984: Edwards versus Stobart
On November 17, 1984, BYU entered the Holy War 10–0 and ranked #3 in the AP Poll. BYU overcame several turnovers to win 24–14. BYU would finish the season 13–0 and be the only undefeated team in Division I-A (now the Football Bowl Subdivision). They were voted number one in the final AP Poll as well as the Coaches' Poll to become consensus national champions. This was the last time a team outside the Power Five conferences won a national championship; the previous being Army in 1945.

1985–1989: Edwards versus Fassel
In 1988, BYU had won every game since 1978 and entered the Holy War game as an 11-point favorite. Utah had a 5–5 record while BYU was 8–2 and had already accepted an invitation to the Freedom Bowl. Utah, led by quarterback Scott Mitchell, started the game by gaining a 21–0 lead on the way to winning 57–28. The 1988 team set a series record for points scored against BYU—a record that stands today. The game came to be known locally as "the Rice Bowl" because the game was played at Utah's Rice Stadium.
The next year, BYU set a series record by scoring 70 against Utah. BYU jumped to a 49–0 lead before Utah scored its first touchdown just before halftime. Behind quarterback Ty Detmer, BYU scored eight touchdowns on its first eight possessions and amassed over 750 yards of total offense. Utah would score three touchdowns in the fourth quarter, leading to a 70–31 victory.  The 101 points the two teams scored is still a series record.

The modern rivalry 
By the mid-1990s, the Cougars' prowess leveled off from their successes of the 1970s and 1980s. Around this time, the Utes also improved significantly, and the rivalry became much more competitive.

1990–2000: Edwards versus McBride
The nature of the rivalry began to change in 1993, during McBride's fourth season as head coach. The Utes won their first game in Provo in twenty-two seasons and their first Holy War game since Edwards became BYU's head coach. With less than a minute remaining, Utah's kicker Chris Yergensen, who had already missed two out of three field goals on the day, broke the 31–31 tie with a game-winning 55-yard field goal.

After the win, Utah fans and players attempted to tear down the north end zone goalpost at what was then Cougar Stadium. Cougar players returned to the field to protect the goalpost from being torn down. About the incident, Lenny Gomes, a BYU nose guard, said, "Typical Utah bullshit. All those guys think that's all there is to life. But when I'm making $50–60,000 a year, they'll be pumping my gas. They're low-class losers." The remark is still remembered in rivalry history today, although Gomes came to admit his regrets about making the statement in later years.

The 1994 season was McBride's best, as he led the Utes to a 10–2 record and a top-10 finish in national rankings. The Holy War game of that year was the first time both the Utes and Cougars played as top-25 ranked teams. The Utes won the game 34–31, which was coincidentally the same score of their meeting a year before. Utah ran its rivalry winning streak up to three games a year later, with a 34–17 win at BYU. The Utes and Cougars traded wins and losses the next couple of years, before the 2000 season.

The Kaneshiro Doink
In 1998, the first Holy War was played at the newly renovated Rice-Eccles Stadium. BYU entered the game with an 8–3 (6–1 WAC) record and was playing for a berth in the WAC Championship game. Utah entered the game with a 7–3 (5–2 WAC) record and was hoping to land a bowl game and spoil BYU's WAC Championship hopes. BYU took a 26–17 lead when Owen Pochman connected on a 47-yard field goal with 2:41 left to play in the game. On the ensuing kickoff, Utah's Daniel Jones returned the ball 95 yards to cut the lead to 26–24. BYU's possession had the ball at the 15-yard line, where Ryan Kaneshiro attempted a 32-yard field goal. The attempt bounced off the right upright, which preserved the win for BYU and caused the goalpost to shake from the "doink".

Utah cheerleader pummels an aggressive fan

During the 1999 edition of the Holy War, Utah recorded its fourth consecutive win in Provo. Early in the fourth quarter, Utah scored a touchdown when quarterback T.D. Crowshaw completed a four-yard-pass to Donny Utu to put Utah up 20–10. In celebration, Utah cheerleader Billy Priddis ran along the visitor's sideline with a large "U" flag. Afterwards, a BYU fan ran onto the sideline and tackled Priddis from behind: Priddis then turned around and attacked the fan, landing seven or eight punches before stadium security apprehended the fan.

About the incident, Priddis said, "There's 65,000 fans here, does he think I'm not going to retaliate?" The fan was banned from the BYU campus for this incident.

From the Utah sideline, receiver Steve Smith taunted BYU fans and yelled, "Even our cheerleaders are kicking your butt," while BYU's athletic director Val Hale was purported to have chastised Priddis and the rest of the Utah cheerleaders.

After the game, he said, "I told them from now on we're going to leave our flags at home and they should do the same. All it does is initiate the fans to throw things out of the stands."

Edwards' last game
Entering the 2000 season, Edwards announced that he was retiring. His final game as Cougars head coach came against the Utes in Salt Lake City, where BYU won, 34–27, with a last-minute drive that ended with a touchdown.

2001 and 2002: Crowton versus McBride
Under new head coach Gary Crowton, BYU entered the 2001 game against Utah at 10–0 and looked to become the first team from outside the BCS to play in a BCS bowl game. A tight game ended with a comeback by BYU. BYU running back Luke Staley scored a touchdown 1:16 left to play, and BYU DB Jenaro Gilford intercepted a pass on the ensuing Ute drive to seal the victory. The 24–21 win gave the Cougars consecutive wins against the Utes for the first time in nearly ten years. The Cougars, however, failed to "bust" the BCS, ending the season with losses to Hawaii and Louisville.

McBride entered the 2002 rivalry game in danger of being fired. The Utes had struggled all season long and even with their 13–6 victory against BYU, Utah finished with their second losing season in three years. The 5–6 finish sealed McBride's fate and he was fired in 2002; Weber State University hired him in December 2004.

2003 and 2004: Crowton versus Meyer
Urban Meyer was hired to replace Ron McBride. Under Meyer, Utah players were not allowed to use the name BYU and began referring rather to the Team Down South or TDS (BYU being about 50 miles south of the U of U), imitating Ohio State coach Woody Hayes practice of referring to Michigan as "that team up north." This reference has become a tradition among Utah fans.

BYU's scoring streak ends

In Meyer's first season, the Utes won the MWC and finished 10–2, which was their best record since the 1994 season. The last game of the regular season, Utah beat BYU for the second straight year with a 3–0 victory. The victory snapped BYU's NCAA record for scoring in 361 straight games—BYU's first shutout since a 20–0 loss to Arizona State on September 25, 1975.

BCS busters

In 2004, Utah had its best season up to that point, with a season record of 12–0. They became the first team to "bust" the BCS, a term used to describe a team from outside the BCS playing in a BCS bowl game. They went on to win their matchup against Pittsburgh in the 2005 Fiesta Bowl. The Utes final regular season game, a 52–21 victory over BYU, clinched the invitation to a BCS bowl. Meyer then left Utah for Florida. After the 2004 season, Gary Crowton resigned after finishing with his third consecutive losing season.

2005–2015: Mendenhall versus Whittingham
In 2005, Bronco Mendenhall and Kyle Whittingham started as head coaches at BYU and Utah, respectively. Whittingham was offered the job at BYU before turning it down and accepting the position at Utah, which added to the rivalry between the two coaches. Whittingham won the overall series against Mendenhall with a tally of 7–3. Eight of the ten games were decided by a touchdown or less. In a December 17, 2009 column, writer Stewart Mandel called the coaching rivalry the best coaching rivalry of that decade.

First overtime game
The 2005 season saw some striking parallels between the two programs. Both had replaced their former head coaches, struggled through parts of their seasons, and would finish the regular season with 6–5 records. When the two met in Provo in November 2005, BYU was looking for its first win against the Utes in three seasons. Utah was looking for a winning record and a shot at a bowl game. BYU entered as the favorite because Utah would be playing without its starting quarterback and its best wide receiver, who had been injured in their previous game. The Utes' played junior college transfer Brett Ratliff as quarterback. The fourth quarter ended with a tied score of 34-34. In overtime, Ratliff completed a touchdown pass leading to a 41–34 Utah victory. Ratliff completed 17 of 32 passes for 240 yards and four touchdowns, and rushing for 112 yards on 19 carries and a touchdown. He was responsible for all five Utah touchdowns.

Beck to Harline
The two teams met again in November 2006, this time in Salt Lake City. BYU gained an early lead, then fell behind and trailed for much of the game. BYU won the game 33–31 with a last-minute touchdown pass from John Beck to Jonny Harline. The win gave BYU an undefeated record of 8–0 in MWC play. Harline caught the pass on his knees in the end zone with no Utah defender near him. The play led to BYU fans creating and wearing T-shirts reading "Harline's still open."

Magic happens

The 2007 game's first 12 points were only field goals, BYU's Mitch Payne scoring 9 points. Utah then scored the first touchdown, taking the lead 10–9. In the fourth quarter, BYU came back with a late-game drive that included a 4th and 18 from its own 12-yard line. Four plays later, freshman running back Harvey Unga ran for a touchdown to win it 17–10. Austin Collie, who caught the Max Hall pass to convert the 4th and 18 to a first down said about the play, "I wouldn't say it was lucky. We executed the play well. We should have had another one. Obviously, when you're doing what's right on and off the field, I think the Lord steps in and plays a part in it. Magic happens." The comment further fueled the religious animosity between the two teams.

BCS busting... again
Four years after becoming the first team from outside the BCS to bust into the BCS, Utah returned to the national stage by going undefeated throughout the 2008 season. The game was fairly even until Utah scored a touchdown with 15 seconds left in the half to put the Utes up by 10. BYU cut the lead to three in the third quarter, but Utah won the game 48–24 following three touchdowns in the fourth quarter.

Second overtime game

In 2009, in the second overtime game in series history, BYU defeated Utah 26–23. BYU held a 20–6 lead entering the fourth quarter. Utah scored 14 fourth-quarter points to force overtime, but their comeback fell short. Utah managed a field goal in overtime to take a 23–20 lead, but on BYU's possession, Max Hall connected to tight end Andrew George for a 25-yard touchdown reception and the victory. The game was dubbed "George is still running" by BYU fans.

During the postgame press conference, Hall was asked if he felt he had redeemed himself for his performance in the previous year's game in which he had five interceptions and one fumble. Hall responded, "A little bit, yeah. I don't like Utah. In fact, I hate them. I hate everything about them. I hate their program. I hate their fans. I hate everything. So, it feels good to send those guys home. They didn't deserve it. It was our time and it was our time to win. We deserved it. We played as hard as we could tonight, and it felt really good to send them home and to get them out of here, so it is a game I'll always remember." When asked for a clarification and whether he really hated Utah, Hall said, "I think the whole university and their fans and organization is classless. They threw beer on my family and stuff last year, and did a whole bunch of nasty things. I don't respect them, and they deserve to lose."

The next day, Hall issued an apology for his "remarks". He alleged that his "family was spit on, had beer dumped on them and were physically assaulted on several occasions" during the previous year's game at Rice-Eccles Stadium.  Hall had made similar accusations following a loss to the University of Arizona, during his time at Arizona State.

Burton's block
For 2010, the game was played at Rice-Eccles Stadium in Salt Lake City. It was the last game for the two teams as conference rivals. BYU entered the game with a 6–5 while Utah came in at 9–2. In a low-scoring affair, BYU scored two field goals, one in each of the first two quarters, to lead 6–0 at halftime. In the third quarter, the Cougars got a touchdown on a 21-yard pass play from Jake Heaps to McKay Jacobson, to take a 13–0 lead. The fourth quarter began with Utah scoring a 40-yard field goal, cutting the lead to 13–3, and then after Utah recovered a BYU fumble, Utah capitalized with a 37-yard touchdown pass from Jordan Wynn to DeVonte Christopher to make the score 13–10. The Cougars responded with a field goal, to make it 16–10.

Utah responded to a series of turnovers with a Matt Asiata touchdown on a 3-yard run to make it 17–16 with 4:24 remaining. BYU then drove down the field to Utah's 22-yard line, to set up Mitch Payne for a game-winning field goal with 4 seconds remaining. However, Utah cornerback Brandon Burton raced from the outside to block the kick and secure a 17–16 Utah victory.

Shock and Awe
With Utah having left for the Pac-12 and BYU declaring conference independence, the 2011 BYU home game against Utah was the rivalry's first non-conference game since 1898. BYU suffered a rough start on its opening drive, when on its third play, the ball was snapped over quarterback Jake Heaps' head and recovered for a touchdown by Utah DE Derrick Shelby. The remainder of the 1st quarter held similar luck for BYU, with Running back JJ Di'Luigi being stripped of the ball on 1st and Goal from the Utah 6-yard line. The 2nd quarter proved more competitive with BYU completing a 32-yard TD pass to WR Ross Apo. Utah answered with 30-yard TD pass from QB Jordan Wynn to freshman TE Jake Murphy, just two minutes before the half. Utah led at halftime 14–10.

After a first half that seemed to promise the typical nail-biter game that the last decade of the rivalry had shown, it was anything but. The Utes scored 40 unanswered points in the 2nd half (a total of 47 unanswered). Turnovers continued to plague BYU, who would finish with 7, including JD Falslev's mishandled kickoff return at their own 6-yard line, QB Jake Heaps fumble at their own 6-yard line, and QB Riley Nelson's (substituted in for Heaps in the 4th quarter) fumble after being sacked, returned 57 yards for a TD by freshman LB V.J. Fehoko.

The final result of 54–10 was the largest margin of victory for either team in the Holy War since 1983, and Utah's second-largest margin of victory ever in the Holy War. Utah's 54 points were the second most the Utes had ever scored against BYU.

Fandemonium
In 2012, the Holy War ended in dramatic and odd fashion. Utah went into the 4th quarter up 17 points, but the BYU offense brought the game within 3. With less than 30 seconds remaining, BYU quarterback Riley Nelson successfully drove into Utah territory on 4th and long with a 40-yard pass to wide receiver, Cody Hoffman. On what was thought to be the final play of the game, Nelson's deflected pass fell incomplete as time seemingly expired and the Utah fans rushed the field. The pass, however, was shown to hit the ground with one second left, giving BYU an opportunity to kick a field goal from 51 yards (once the fans had been cleared from the field of play). On the attempt, the kick was blocked, the ball recovered by BYU, and the runner subsequently tackled. However, Utah fans again rushed the field, this time before the play was over, thus earning a penalty that gave BYU another chance at a field goal, this one from 36 yards. That attempt was unsuccessful, however, when the kick hit the left upright and went awry, leading Utah fans, who were already on the sidelines, to rush the field for a third and final time. Utah won the game 24–21.

Twenty to Thirteen in 2013
Utah and BYU played the 2013 game under the request of Utah Athletic Director Chris Hill that it would be the final contest until 2016 – a fact that served as motivation for both teams to avoid having to endure a defeat for three years.

Utah found themselves with a 13–0 halftime lead at LaVell Edwards Stadium. BYU scored on their first drive of the 2nd half, a field goal, with 11:39 remaining in the third quarter and the Cougars tacked on another exactly six minutes later. Utah, though, responded with a 79-yard touchdown drive to extend its lead to 20–6 with 12:44 remaining in regulation.

BYU fought back for their 3rd score of the half, this time on a one-yard run by running back Michael Alisa, with 5:44 left in the game to close the gap to seven points. After the Cougar defense forced the Utes to a three-and-out on Utah's next possession, BYU quarterback Taysom Hill was intercepted on the Cougars' next drive with a little more than 90 seconds remaining – appearing to seal the win for Utah.

The Utes would leave Provo with a 20–13 win.

2015 Las Vegas Bowl: Holy War in Sin City

The planned hiatus for 2014–2015 was unexpectedly cut short. On December 6, 2015, it was announced that BYU would play Utah on December 19, 2015 in the Las Vegas Bowl. It was the first time the teams met in the postseason and the first Holy War game to be played at a neutral site.

During the first 8 minutes of the game, Utah forced a Las Vegas Bowl record five turnovers in the first quarter, resulting in a 35–0 lead.  Though BYU would score four unanswered touchdowns to narrow the lead to 35–28, Utah was able to secure a crucial first down at the end of the game to run out the clock. After the first five minutes of the game, BYU never possessed the ball with a chance to tie or take the lead in the game. Utah took the bowl game with a 35–28 win, ending Bronco Mendenhall's last game as BYU's head coach with a loss.

2016–present: Whittingham versus Sitake

2016: Hindsight is 20-20

The first BYU offensive play from scrimmage in the 2016 game resulted in an interception, returned by Sunia Tauteoli for a 41-yard Utah pick-six. However, Utah subsequently committed several turnovers, which would lead to two BYU field goals and a touchdown late in the 2nd Quarter. Utah answered with a touchdown of their own and held a slim 14–13 lead as the teams headed into the locker room for halftime. After adding a field goal in the third quarter and one in the fourth quarter, Utah led 20–13 with 2:47 to go. Taysom Hill led BYU on 75-yard drive, capped off by a 7-yard touchdown run with 18 seconds to play. Rather than kick the PAT to make it 20–20, BYU Head Coach Kalani Sitake decided to go for the two-point conversion and the win. Quarterback Taysom Hill ran the ball up the middle on a draw, but the Utes stopped him at the three-yard line. Utah would emerge victorious by a score of 20–19, despite committing six turnovers in the game.

2017: The Tyler Huntley Show
In the 2017 matchup, Utah quarterback Tyler Huntley racked up a career-high 300 passing yards (27-of-36) and added a career-high 89 yards on the ground and a touchdown. The Utes held a 13-point lead to end the third quarter, but a late fourth quarter touchdown from BYU made it a six-point game, putting the pressure on the Utes' defense. They didn't disappoint, forcing three incomplete passes to regain possession and claim the victory. Utah would win the game, 19–13.

2018: The Comeback
The game on November 24, 2018, was held in Salt Lake City at Rice-Eccles Stadium. BYU (6–5) was the underdog to the Pac-12 South Champion Utah Utes (8–3).  BYU jumped on the Utes, scoring 20 unanswered points. Utah's first score came early in the third quarter from an interception returned for a touchdown.  BYU led 27–7 up until 40 seconds remained in the third quarter. After a Utah touchdown, the resulting momentum shift led to two touchdown runs by Armand Shyne, which gave Utah the lead for the first time with just 3:02 left in regulation.  Utah, up by 1 point (28–27), then forced BYU to turn the ball over on downs with an impressive 4th & 1 stop.  On the first play of the ensuing drive, with 1:43 left in the game, Utah quarterback Jason Shelley ran 33 yards for a touchdown to bring the score to 35–27.  This was the largest deficit overcome for either team in the Holy War series.

2019: Moss Runs and Huntley Taunts

The 100th meeting between the two schools saw Utah winning their 4th straight game at LaVell Edwards Stadium with the help of senior running back Zack Moss, who rushed for 187 yards and scored a touchdown. Utah would win the game, 30–12, and extend their winning streak over BYU to 9 games.

2021: 10 Does Not Come
The Cougars and Utes did not meet in the 2020 season as a result of the COVID-19 pandemic and next met on September 11, 2021, in Provo, a day after BYU accepted an invitation to play in the Big 12 Conference starting in 2023. Pre-game build-up was notable for Utah fans' high levels of confidence in extending their rivalry winning streak to 10 games, which would have been the longest in series history by either team. One mantra among the Ute faithful that stood out in the months leading to the game was the ominous "10 is coming". However, the 21st-ranked Utes faltered early offensively, turning the ball over twice in the first quarter. BYU capitalized and controlled the trenches for a large majority of the game, eventually building a 23-7 lead to begin the fourth quarter. The Utes would attempt to mount a comeback, cutting the deficit to three, but BYU wore them down late, kicking a field goal with 3:17 left to put them up 26–17. After the Utes did not convert on 4th down on their ensuing possession, BYU ran out the clock. As time expired, BYU fans rushed out on the field to celebrate. The upset victory for BYU ended their nine-game losing streak and marked their first win over Utah since 2009, and Kalani Sitake's first win over Utah as BYU head coach. BYU quarterback Jaren Hall accounted for over 200 total yards with three passing touchdowns in the win, and the Cougars rushed for 231 yards against a Ute defense that had often stifled their running game in the decade past.

Future games
After the game in 2021, the series is on a two-year hiatus, with Utah playing a home-and-home series with Florida. With BYU set to join the Big 12 in 2023, the continuation of the series, though set to resume until at least 2028, is in serious doubt.

Game results

See also 
 BYU–Utah rivalry
 List of NCAA college football rivalry games

External links
BYU vs. Utah – Utah's Football Holy War

References

College football rivalries in the United States
BYU Cougars football
Utah Utes football
1896 establishments in Utah